The 1930 South Sydney Rabbitohs season was the 23rd in the club's history. The club competed in the New South Wales Rugby Football League Premiership (NSWRFL), finishing 3rd for the season.

Ladder

Fixtures

Regular season

Finals

References 

South Sydney Rabbitohs seasons
South Sydney season